The Jasper County School District is a public school district in Jasper County, Georgia, United States, based in Monticello. It serves the communities of Monticello and Shady Dale.

Schools
The Jasper County School District has two elementary schools, one middle school, and one high school.

Elementary schools
 Jasper County Primary School
 Washington Park Elementary School

Middle school
 Jasper County Middle School

High school
 Jasper County High School

References

Further reading

 Peter Holley, "Mother Claims Principal Threatened Her with Jail if 5-year-old Son Wasn’t Paddled," Washington Post, April 17, 2016.

External links 

School districts in Georgia (U.S. state)
Education in Jasper County, Georgia